An apostolnik or epimandylion is an item of clerical clothing worn by Eastern Orthodox and Byzantine Catholic nuns. It is a cloth veil that covers the head, neck, and shoulders similar to a  form of hijab worn by Muslim women, usually black, but sometimes white.  It is sometimes worn with a skufia.

The nun typically receives the apostolnik when she becomes a novice.  While it is usually replaced with the epanokamelavkion when the nun becomes a rassophor, many nuns will continue to wear the apostolnik for the sake of convenience, much as a monk will continue to wear a skufia instead of a klobuk when not attending the Divine Liturgy.

In some practices, a novice will wear a black scarf covering the head and tied under the chin.  She will then receive the apostolnik at her tonsure.  In this practice, the epanokamelavkion may be reserved for the abbess and for nuns of the Great Schema.

See also 
 Koukoulion
 Skufia
 Klobuk

References

Eastern Christian vestments
Headgear